The Alliance of Artists Communities is an international non-profit arts organization. Founded in 1991 following a pilot program and recommendation through the MacArthur Foundation, the organization is focused on advocacy, promotion, and cultivation of residencies for artists and artist communities. The organization created the first national directory of artist communities in 1995.

Members of the Alliance include the MacDowell Colony (Peterborough, New Hampshire, US), the Archie Bray Foundation for the Ceramic Arts (Helena, Montana, US), Yaddo (Saratoga Springs, New York, US), and Red Gate Gallery (Beijing, China).

The organization's headquarters are in Providence, Rhode Island, following an invitation in 2002 by then Rhode Island School of Design president Roger Mandle.

References 

Arts organizations based in Rhode Island
Non-profit organizations based in Rhode Island